Ben Barrington is a New Zealand actor, is best known for his roles, "Dr. Drew McCaskill" in Shortland Street and Olaf Johnson in The Almighty Johnsons.

Personal life 
Barrington married his partner, makeup artist Kristie Fergus, in March 2019. They have a daughter born in 2016.

Career 
Barrington was attracted to acting while studying at Waikato University. He graduated from Toi Whakaari: New Zealand Drama School in 2001 with a Bachelor of Performing Arts (Acting). He has appeared in many local productions, including The Insider's Guide To Happiness, The Insider's Guide To Love, The Strip, Outrageous Fortune, and Top of the Lake.

He is best known for his role, "Olaf Johnson" in The Almighty Johnsons.

In 2015, Barrington was a participant in New Zealand's Dancing With the Stars 6.

He mainly stars on Shortland Street as Dr Drew McCaskill on the Plastic Surgery Clinic with his ex-wife Virginia and his underage surgery person Millie Hutchins. In the 2015 Season Finale Dr Drew McCaskill was shot in the leg once by Gareth demanding revenge and another time in the upper shoulder. He was shot at the end of the episode by Victoria Anderton, the doctor who sought revenge because Drew did not support her placement in General Surgery.

Filmography

References

External links
 

Living people
University of Waikato alumni
21st-century New Zealand male actors
New Zealand male film actors
New Zealand male television actors
New Zealand male soap opera actors
Year of birth missing (living people)
Toi Whakaari alumni